Bethuadahari Wildlife Sanctuary is situated in the Bethuadahari town (Nakashipara area) of Nadia District, West Bengal, India. The sanctuary is located beside National Highway 12 (old no NH 34). The sanctuary covers 67 hectares, and was established in 1980 to preserve a portion of the central Gangetic alluvial zone.

Geography

Location

Note: The map alongside presents some of the notable locations in the subdivision. All places marked in the map are linked in the larger full screen map. All the four subdivisions are presented with maps on the same scale – the size of the maps vary as per the area of the subdivision.

Fauna and flora
The sanctuary has a large population of spotted deer (chital), jackal, Bengal fox, porcupine, Asian plam Civet cat, Jungle Cat, Small civet Cat, Black Napped Hare and common langur. Bird species include parakeets,(Rose Ring parakeet, Plum headed parakeet, Alexandrine parakeet, Red-breasted parakeet)Owls-Barn Owl, Spotted Owlet, Brown Fish Owl, Scopes owl,  Indian cuckoos, barbets and other smaller birds, while reptiles -Spectacled Cobra, Monocled Cobra, Russell’s Viper, Common Krait, Banded Krait, Common Cat Snake, Green Vine Snake, Rainbow Mud snake, ornate flying snake, Copper haded trinket, Indian Rat Snake, Buff Striped keelback, Checkered keelback, Common wolf snake, Twine Spotted Wolf snake, Common Kukri snake, Red sand boa, Common sand boa and amphibians include pythons, monitor lizards and gharials, a type of small crocodile. The sanctuary is wonderful space for beginner photographers, tourists etc. All should visit the place occasionally. The amazing rock python is the greatest attraction of the forest.

As of the 1995 census, it had 297 chital deer.

Among the trees found within the sanctuary are shal, teak, arjun, Indian rosewood, and bamboo.

Bethuadahari picture gallery

References

External links 

 

Wildlife sanctuaries in West Bengal
Tourist attractions in Nadia district
Protected areas established in 1980
1980 establishments in West Bengal